Aqa Beyglu may refer to:
 Aqa Beyglu, Ardabil
 Aqa Beyglu, West Azerbaijan